Foundouk El Attarine (Arabic: فندق العطارين) is one of the fondouks of the medina of Tunis. It is located in Souk El Attarine that used to serve as a storage place for the perfumers of the medina.

History 
The monument was built during the Hafsid dynasty's reign.
Nowadays, it is used as a restaurant.

References 

Medina of Tunis